Acıgöl–Nevşehir is a volcano in Turkey with an elevation of .

It is a caldera volcano about 7 by 8 km wide and is traversed by the national highway from Acıgöl to Nevşehir.

See also
List of volcanoes in Turkey

References

Calderas of Turkey
Landforms of Nevşehir Province
Pleistocene calderas